Alexandre Bonnot (born July 31, 1973) is a former football midfielder.

Career
Bonnot started his professional career with Paris Saint-Germain in 1990, before joining SCO Angers in 1995. He had a loan spell with Watford for the 1998-99 season, before making the move permanent. He made 12 appearances for the Hornets during their 1999-2000 Premiership campaign. He fell out of favour next season and joined Queen's Park Rangers on a free transfer in 2001. After just one season with the club he retired.

References

External links
 Blind, Stupid and Desperate - Watford FC site - Gone but not forgotten
 Alexandre Bonnot - Watford FC - Football-Heroes.net
 Career stats at soccerbase

1973 births
Living people
People from Poissy
French footballers
Association football midfielders
Premier League players
Paris Saint-Germain F.C. players
Angers SCO players
Watford F.C. players
Queens Park Rangers F.C. players
Expatriate footballers in England
French expatriate footballers
Footballers from Yvelines